Bari Karsaf (also Romanized as Bārī Karsaf and Bārīkarsaf; also known as Bārī Karafs) is a village in Neyasar Rural District, Neyasar District, Kashan County, Isfahan Province, Iran. At the 2006 census, its population was 360, in 103 families.

References 

Populated places in Kashan County